Mehmet Aksoy may refer to:
 Mehmet Aksoy (sculptor) (born 1939), Turkish sculptor
 Mehmet Aksoy (filmmaker) (1985–2017), British-Kurdish filmmaker